Horowe Bagno - is a peat nature reserve in Marki near Warsaw in Poland. The area of the reserve is 43,82 ha.

Footnotes

Horowe Bagno
Geography of Masovian Voivodeship